is a 1982 arcade platform game that was released by Nintendo. It is the sequel to Donkey Kong, but with the roles reversed compared to its predecessor: Mario (previously named "Jumpman") is now the villain and Donkey Kong Jr. is trying to rescue his father. It first released in arcades and, over the course of the decade, was released for a variety of home platforms. The game's title is written out as Donkey Kong Junior in the North American arcade version and various conversions to non-Nintendo systems.

The game was principally designed by Shigeru Miyamoto and his coworker and the company's chief engineer Gunpei Yokoi. Miyamoto also created the graphics for the title along with Yoshio Sakamoto. As with its predecessor, the music for the game was composed by Yukio Kaneoka.

Gameplay

Like its predecessor, Donkey Kong Jr. is a platform game. There are a total of four stages, each with a unique theme. DK Jr. can run left and right, jump, and grab vines/chains/ropes to climb higher on the screen. He can slide down faster by holding only one vine, or climb faster by holding two. Enemies include "Snapjaws", which resemble bear traps with eyes; bird-like creatures called "Nitpickers", some of which can attack by dropping eggs; and "Sparks" which roam across the wiring in one of Mario's hideouts. DK Jr. can jump over these enemies while on platforms, switch from one vine/chain/rope to another to dodge them, or knock down pieces of fruit that will destroy every enemy they touch before falling off the bottom of the screen.

To pass the first three stages, DK Jr. must reach the key hanging next to his father's cage, whereupon Mario flees while pushing the cage off the screen. In the fourth stage, DK Jr. must push six keys into locks on the topmost platform to free Donkey Kong. After a brief cutscene, the player is taken back to the first stage at an increased difficulty. A bonus timer runs throughout each stage, and any points remaining on it are added to the player's score upon completion.

DK Jr. loses a life when he touches any enemy or projectile, falls too great a distance, touches the water and falls off the bottom of the screen or if the bonus timer counts down to zero. The game ends when the player loses all of their lives.

Plot
Donkey Kong, after being defeated by Mario, has been entrusted into his care. However, his son, Donkey Kong Jr., appears and attempts to rescue his father. Mario takes his keys and places them in the building he fought Donkey Kong in. To stop Donkey Kong Jr., Mario unleashes several circus animals, but Donkey Kong Jr. escapes them and makes it to Mario’s headquarters. The two face off but the building begins to crumble, causing a recreation of Donkey Kong's climatic scene. Donkey Kong Jr. saves Donkey Kong and the two set off together.

Development
During Donkey Kong’s development in 1981, Shigeru Miyamoto's team had come up with several ideas and full complete levels that wouldn't really fit into the game due to the various constraints. His team eventually began fleshing out these concepts, and these designs evolved into something all their own. The process was so far along, with even entire stages conceived, that one of the team members suggested they start working on another video game. The conversation happened around the same time that Nintendo wanted another Donkey Kong coin-op to capitalize on the original's fame, giving Miyamoto the perfect opportunity to further explore his newly established franchise. Originally, Miyamoto wanted the new game to star Donkey Kong himself, but there were problems with the character's massive size. He wouldn't be maneuverable on the screen, so a new star was needed. The change brought about a new hero and drove the narrative in an entirely new direction. They ultimately came up with the idea to make a smaller Donkey Kong in place of Mario who would be the son of Donkey Kong. Since they still wanted a big Donkey Kong on top of the screen, they came up with the plot of Mario capturing him after the events of the first game.

Versions
The order of the levels is different in different territories. In the Japanese version, the four levels appear in 1-2-3-4 sequence and then repeat, just as with the Japanese release of Donkey Kong. In the US version, the order is 1–4. 1-2-4, 1-3-4, 1-2-3-4 and then 1-2-3-4 from then on.

Kill screen
Donkey Kong Jr. has a kill screen at level 22. Due to the level counter only having one digit, the counter shows numbers 1 to 9 in levels 1 to 9, seven blanks in levels 10 to 16, and the letters A to F in the levels 17–22. The kill screen occurs the same way as in Donkey Kong, where an integer overflow occurs after too big a result is given after a multiplication problem in the computing. The timer counts as if there are 700 points, then kills Donkey Kong Jr. until all lives are gone.

Console versions

Donkey Kong Jr. was made on the NES (for which it was one of three Japanese launch games), Family Computer Disk System, Atari 2600, Atari 7800, Atari 8-bit family, ColecoVision, Coleco Adam, and Intellivision. A BBC Micro conversion was made but unreleased. Three Game & Watch versions of the game were also made. Two black-and-white versions for the New Wide Screen and Multi Screen handheld series (later under the model name Donkey Kong II), and a color version for the Tabletop and Panorama series. In 2002 the NES version was rereleased on the GBA add-on, the e-reader.

Reception
In Japan, the original arcade version was the eighth-highest-grossing arcade game of 1982.

Raymond Dimetrosky of Video Games Player gave the ColecoVision version a positive review. He compared it favorably with another ColecoVision arcade conversion released at the same time, Sega's Space Fury, writing that Donkey Kong Jr. has better graphics and gameplay. Computer Games magazine in 1984 reviewed the Coleco Adam version, calling it a "supergame adaptation" and the best conversion of the game.

Donkey Kong Jr. received an award in the category of "1984 Best Videogame Audio-Visual Effects (16K or more ROM)" at the 5th annual Arkie Awards, where the judges described it as "great fun", and noted that the game was successful as a sequel–"extend[ing] the theme and present[ing] a radically different play-action" than its predecessor, Donkey Kong.

Donkey Kong Jr. is regarded as one of the Top 100 Video Games by the Killer List of Videogames. It was selected to be among five arcade games chosen for history's first official video game world championship, which was filmed at Twin Galaxies in Ottumwa, Iowa by ABC-TV's That's Incredible! over the weekend of January 8–9, 1983.

Allgame gave a review score of 4 out of 5 stars praising the graphics and sound being "exceptionally arcade-like" and the controls and play mechanics being faithful to the arcade version.

Legacy

Rereleases
The NES version–along with its predecessor Donkey Kong–was re–released in 1988 in an NES compilation titled Donkey Kong Classics. This version was later released on the e-Reader and is available on the Virtual Console for the Wii. The NES version is also a playable game on Animal Crossing, though a special password is needed from an official website which is now no longer available. Donkey Kong Jr. was made available for the Nintendo 3DS from the Nintendo eShop, released in Japan on April 18, 2012, in North America on June 14, and in Europe on August 23 and was given away free to the Ambassadors users before the full release. It was again released for the Wii U Virtual Console in 2014. The arcade version of Donkey Kong Jr., featuring both the Japanese and American versions, was released by Hamster Corporation for the Nintendo Switch as part of the company's Arcade Archives series in December 2018.

In 2004, Namco released an arcade cabinet which contained Donkey Kong, Donkey Kong Jr. and Mario Bros.

Competitive play
On August 10, 2008, Icarus Hall of Port Angeles, Washington, scored 1,033,000 points playing Donkey Kong Jr.

On April 24, 2009, Steve Wiebe eclipsed Hall's score, finishing with 1,139,800 points. On September 3, at 1984 Arcade in Springfield, Missouri, Mark L. Kiehl of Enid, Oklahoma surpassed Wiebe's record with a score of 1,147,800. Steve Wiebe regained the record with a score of 1,190,400 on his home machine set on Tuesday, February 16, 2010. Mark Kiehl has since eclipsed the previous world record with a score of 1,307,500. , Kiehl continues to hold the record today with a score of 1,412,200.

In popular culture
The game spawned a cereal with fruit-flavored cereal pieces shaped like bananas and cherries.

The game was featured on numerous episodes of Starcade. Host Geoff Edwards noted that he had the arcade machine in his dressing room and found the game to be highly difficult.

Donkey Kong Jr. was a cartoon on Saturday Supercade (a series that aired on Saturday mornings from 1983 to 1985) with the title character voiced by Frank Welker.

Donkey Kong Jr. is one of the 8 playable characters in Super Mario Kart for the SNES. He is also a playable character in Mario's Tennis on Virtual Boy and Mario Tennis on the Nintendo 64.

In the version of Super Mario Bros. 3 seen in Super Mario All-Stars, as well as the Game Boy Advance version, the king of World 4 was transformed into a young gorilla identical to Donkey Kong Jr.

Donkey Kong Jr. is among the characters in Super Mario Maker that players can transform into by use of Mystery Mushrooms.

Notes

References

External links
 
 
 Donkey Kong Jr. scoreboard at Twin Galaxies
 Donkey Kong Jr. at NinDB
 Official Nintendo Wii Virtual Console minisite 
 Official Nintendo 3DS eshop minisite 
 Official Nintendo Wii U eshop minisite 
 Official Nintendo Wii minisite  
 Official Nintendo 3DS minisite  
 Official Nintendo Wii U minisite  

1982 video games
Arcade video games
Atari 2600 games
Atari 7800 games
Atari 8-bit family games
Atari games
BBC Micro and Acorn Electron games
ColecoVision games
Commodore 64 games
Donkey Kong platform games
Famicom Disk System games
Game & Watch games
Intellivision games
Nintendo arcade games
Nintendo Entertainment System games
Nintendo e-Reader games
Nintendo Research & Development 1 games
Nintendo Switch Online games
Nintendo Switch games
Platform games
Video game sequels
Video games about children
Video games developed in Japan
Video games directed by Shigeru Miyamoto
Virtual Console games for Nintendo 3DS
Virtual Console games for Wii
Virtual Console games for Wii U
Hamster Corporation games
Multiplayer and single-player video games